The sandbar shiner (Notropis scepticus) is a species of ray-finned fish in the genus Notropis.

It is endemic to the Southeastern United States.

It is native from the Cape Fear River drainage in North Carolina, to the Savannah River drainage in Georgia.

References 

 

Notropis
Shiner, Sandbar
Shiner, Sandbar
Freshwater fish of the Southeastern United States
Fish described in 1883
Taxa named by David Starr Jordan